Taxillus（Chinese : 桑寄生） is a plant genus in the mistletoe family: Loranthaceae.

Species 
 Taxillus assamicus  Danser
 Taxillus balansae (Lecomte) Danser
 Taxillus baviensis Bân
 Taxillus bracteatus Van Tiegh.
 Taxillus caloreas (Diels) Danser
 Taxillus chinensis (DC.) Danser
 Taxillus delavayi (Tiegh.) Danser
 Taxillus kaempferi (DC.) Danser
 Taxillus levinei (Merr.) H.S. Kiu
 Taxillus limprichtii (Grüning) H.S. Kiu
 Taxillus liquidambaricola (Hayata) Hosok.
 Taxillus nigrans (Hance) Danser
 Taxillus pseudochinensis (Yamam.) Danser
 Taxillus renii H. S. Kiu
 Taxillus sclerophyllus (Thw.) Danser 
 Taxillus sutchuenensis (Lecomte) Danser
 Taxillus sutchuenensis var. duclouxii
 Taxillus theifer (Hayata) H.S. Kiu
 Taxillus thibetensis (Lecomte) Danser
 Taxillus tomentosus Tiegh.
 Taxillus tsaii S.T. Chiu
 Taxillus umbellifer (Schult. f.) Danser
 Taxillus vestitus (Wall.) Danser
 Taxillus wiensii Balle ex Polhill
 Taxillus yadoriki (Maxim.) Danser
 Taxillus zenii H.S. Kiu

References

External links

Loranthaceae
Loranthaceae genera